Living the Dream is the first solo album by the StarStruck winner Jennylyn Mercado, released in 2004.

Track listing

Personnel
 Buddy C. Medina - executive producer
 Rene Salta - in charge of marketing
 Kedy Sanchez - A&R supervising producer
 GMA Artist Center - artist management
 Jimmy Antiporda
 Aji Manalo
 Arnold Jallores
 Boggie Manipon
 Dominique Benedicto
 Alexi Corbilla
 Ramil Bahandi
 Marlon Silva
 Dong Tan - cover concept, cover design & execution
 Claude Rodrigo - cover design & execution
 Jake Versoza - photography
 Mariel Chua - hair & make-up
 Ana Kalw - wardrobe

See also
GMA Records
GMA Network

2004 albums
Jennylyn Mercado albums
GMA Music albums